Igor Lukanin (born 3 February 1976) is a former competitive ice dancer who competed internationally for Azerbaijan with Kristin Fraser.

He previously competed for Germany with Ksenia Smetanenko. He competed with Jenny Dahlen for two years, representing Azerbaijan. He teamed up with Kristin Fraser in 2000. They are four-time Azerbaijani national champions and have competed at the 2002 Winter Olympics and the 2006 Winter Olympics.

Lukanin was married to Daria Timoshenko from 2000 to 2005. He married Kristin Fraser on December 31, 2010.

Results

With Fraser for Azerbaijan

With Dahlen for Azerbaijan

With Smetanenko for Germany

Programs 
(with Lukanin)

References

 1996 German Championships
 1997 German Championships

External links

 Official site
 

1976 births
Living people
Azerbaijani male ice dancers
German male ice dancers
Figure skaters at the 2002 Winter Olympics
Figure skaters at the 2006 Winter Olympics
Olympic figure skaters of Azerbaijan
Sportspeople from Yekaterinburg
Azerbaijani people of Russian descent